BANK was an artists' group active in London during the 1990s.

History and project

Simon Bedwell and John Russell spent a few years on sporadic art events and fake mailout-only 'shows' in the years after leaving St Martins artschool, then in 1991 organised their first proper show, with fellow ex-St Martins friend Dino Demosthenous, in an ex-Barclays on Lewisham Way, South London; this is where the name BANK came from. Dino Demosthenous left in 1992. In 1993, Russell and Bedwell were joined by Milly Thompson, David Burrows and Andrew Williamson (Bedwell, Burrows and Williamson having worked as a group sporadically for the 2 years previously, with shows at Richard Demarco gallery Edinburgh, and Clove 2, London). Burrows left BANK in 1995, Williamson in 1998, Russell in 2000. When BANK's own gallery, Gallerie Poo Poo, closed after the three-day show Press Release in January 1999, the group began to exhibit their collective work in other venues: The Mayor Gallery, London, Magasin 4, Bregenz, Rupert Goldsworthy Gallery, New York, Anthony Wilkinson Gallery, London, Chapman FineARTS, London, Suburban, Chicago, and finally the inaugural show at Store, London, after which Milly Thompson and Simon Bedwell began to work separately as artists whilst managing the BANK archive. BANK works have continued to circulate in exhibitions in the UK and abroad, most recently in The Banquet Years, a mini-retrospective at MOT International, London, who now represent the 'estate' of BANK as well as Bedwell and Russell.

BANK's contribution to UK contemporary art was a series of curated group shows, often with comical, and sometimes offensive, titles. As a group they adopted an aggressive stance towards the mainstream contemporary art scene of the time.

The approximately twenty shows curated by BANK included the work of the BANK artists alongside the work of several future Turner Prize nominees and winners. Although the BANK exhibitions were mostly held in warehouse spaces on Curtain Road, then Underwood Street (both Shoreditch, London) the name of the gallery changed. Initially it was BANKSPACE, then DOG, and finally Gallerie Poo-Poo.  The various artworks were bound together, via polemical mailouts, deliberately overt thematizing and radically non-hierarchical methods of display, within single sprawling installations with a penchant for what then seemed like visual vulgarity.

BANK also published a satirical magazine delivering tabloid-style critiques of the art world. Headlines included, "AD MAN YOU’RE A BAD MAN," and, "GALLERIES 'ALL OWNED BY RICH PEOPLE' SHOCK." Other "frankly adolescent" headlines were "ARSE COUNCIL", "SIMON PATTERSON - ONE IDEA, EIGHT YEARS", "CARRY ON CURATING", "PIPPA-LOTTA-RIST-ACTION" and "SAM-TAYLOR WOULD-NOT" These 34 tabloids, along with the Fax-Back project - in which gallery press releases were returned to galleries with corrections and commentary - have since become BANK's best known work.

Julian Stallabrass describes BANK’s activity as "the parodic creation of corporate identity at the centre of which (as their name suggests) is a noisy and constant reference to that matter of which the art world usually whispers: money." They had, according to Matthew Collings, a "surly, self-destructive, self-conscious, introspective attitude - combined...with critical intelligence and a flair for spotting weaknesses in the art system".

BANK SHOWS 1991–2003

2003		
SIMON BEDWELL & MILLY THOMPSON Store, London
ART IS HELL The Suburban, Chicago

2002		
BANK Anthony Wilkinson Gallery, London
CAPITULATER! Project, Dublin (solo BANK show/billboard)

2001		
BANK Chapman Fine Arts, London,
BANK Centre for Artist Books, University of Dundee

1999	
PRESS RELEASE  Gallerie Poo Poo, London
PRESS RELEASE Rupert Goldsworthy Gallery, New York
IF HOPE WAS A TIME MACHINE Magazin 4, Bregenz, Austria
DEAD LIFE Mayor Gallery, London

1998		
WHITE3 (BANK, Bethan Huws) Gallerie Poo Poo, London
WHITE3 (BANK, Art & Language), Gallerie Poo Poo, London
WHITE3 (BANK, Lolly Batty), Gallerie Poo Poo, London
STOP SHORT-CHANGING US. POPULAR CULTURE IS FOR IDIOTS. WE BELIEVE IN ART!  Gallerie Poo Poo, London
GALLERIE WINNER (BANK, Wayne Lloyd) Gallerie Poo Poo, London
CONFERENCE Waygood Gallery, Newcastle

1997	
SEWAGE LUST ICA (Nash&Brandon Rooms), London
JESUS WAS A JEW
The Works, Berlin,Germany
MASK OF GOLD (Christy Astuy, Bank, David Burrows, Roddy Thomson & the Lowe Brothers, Margarita Gluzberg, Mark Jones, Peter Seymour, Eric Wright) Gallerie Poo Poo, London
WINKLE THE POT BELLIED PIG AND HIS WOODLAND CHUMS (Bank, Jake & Dinos Chapman, Minimal Club, John Cussans & Ranu Mukhergee, Michelle Griffiths, Russell Haswell) Gallerie Poo Poo, London & Bricks and Kicks, Vienna
IT'S A STITCH-UP!  DOG, London
GOD (Liz Arnold, BANK) DOG, London

1996	
DOG-U-MENTAL VIII!!!  (Terry Atkinson, Bank, Dave Beech, David Burrows, Carina Diepens, Keith Farquar, Rebecca Howard, Michael Kay, Graham Ramsay, Fergal Stapleton, John Stezaker, Milly Thompson, Rebecca Warren, Wayne Winner) DOG, London
Viper/BANK TV (130 artists incl. Liz Arnold, Dave Beech, David Burrows, Tracey Emin, Kenneth Hay/Seetha A (Moorland Productions), Michael Kay, Leeds United, Beagles & Ramsay, Orphan Drift, Bob & Roberta Smith, Martin Vincent, Wayne Winner) DOG, London/Dukes Bar, Manchester
F**K OFF! (BANK, Lolly Batty, Gavin Turk, Rebecca Warren) DOG, London BANKcatalogue
THE HAPPY SQUIRREL CLUB (Liz Arnold, BANK, Anke Dessin, Stephen Glynn, Roddy Thompson/Colin Lowe, Neil Miller, Matt Mitchell, Mike Nelson, Peter Newman, Stephen Nicolas/Stephen Caley, Orphan Drift, Rebecca Warren) De Fabriek, Eindhoven, Netherlands

1995
COCAINE ORGASM (Tim Allen, Liz Arnold, (Maxine Boobyer?), Bank, Lolly Batty, Dave Beech, Simon Bill, John Cussans & Ranu Mukhergee, Stephen Glynn, Gerard Hemsworth, Simon Martin/Anna Mossman, Soren Martinsen, Muntean/Rosenblum, Chris Ofili, Janette Parris, John Stezaker, Michael Stubbs, Jessicca Voorsanger, Rebecca Warren, Max Wigram, Andrew Williamson) BANKSPACE, London
THE CHARGE OF THE LIGHT BRIGADE (BANK, Simon Bedwell, John Cussans & Colin Lane, Matthew Higgs, 0rphan.drift>, Ingrid Pollard, Bob & Roberta Smith), BANKSPACE, London
ZOMBIE GOLF (BANK, Dave Beech, Adam Chodzko, Maria Cook, Martin Creed, Peter Doig, Matthew Higgs, Sivan Lewin, John Stezaker), BANKSPACE, London

1994	
WISH YOU WERE HERE (Simon Bedwell, Sonia Boyce, David Burrows, The Cabinet Gallery, Lucy Gunning, Anne Lislegaard, Matt Mitchell, Ian Pratt, John Russell, Bob & Roberta Smith, Milly Thompson, Andrew Williamson, cur Bank), BANKSPACE, London & Newcastle

1993		
NATURAL HISTORY (Simon Bedwell, David Burrows, John Russell, Milly Thompson, John Timberlake, Andrew Williamson) Battlebridge Centre, 2 - 6 Battlebridge Road, London NW1

1992		
SPACE INTERNATIONAL (Simon Bedwell, Luis Contreras, Dino Demosthenous, Valentine Figueros, Esther McLaughlin, Susanna Medina, Derek Ogbourne, Jim Russell, John Russell, Stephen Park, Clifton Steinberg, John Timberlake, Battlebridge Centre, 2-6 Battlebridge Road, London NW1 & El Dientes Del Tiempo Gallery, Valencia, Spain
CHLORINE (Simon Bedwell, Dino Demosthenous, Julia Judge, Michael Rohde, John Russell, Carol Smith, Christopher Winter, Marshall Street Leisure Centre. Soho, London

1991		
BANK (Simon Bedwell, Dino Demosthenous, John Russell, Carole Smith, Christopher Winter) ex-Barclays Bank, 239 Lewisham Way, London

Selected exhibitions since 2003
2013 THE BANQUET YEARS MOT International, London

2012		SELF PORTRAIT: RELICS AND ARCHIVES Treize, Paris WRITER IN RESIDENCE Ormeston House, Limerick, Eire		

2010		RUDE BRITTANNIA: BRITISH COMIC ART Tate Britain, London
		GRAND NATIONAL: ART FROM BRITAIN Vestfossen Kunstlaboratorium, Vestfossen, Norway
		PUBLIC SERVICE ANNOUNCEMENT Invisible Exports, New York
		EAST END PROMISE: SHOREDITCH 1985-2000 Red Gallery London
		SO BE IT:INTERVENTIONS IN PRINTED MATTER Roth, NY
		GALLERY, GALERIE, GALLERIA Norma Mangione Gallery, Turin

2009		IN NUMBERS: SERIAL PUBLICATIONS BY ARTISTS X Initiative, New York
		THE MIND OF THIS DEATH IS UNRELENTINGLY AWAKE Office for Contemporary Art, Oslo, Norway.
		FAX The Drawing Center, New York; Contemporary Museum, Baltimore
		THE LITTLE SHOP ON HOXTON STREET Limoncello, London

2008 	LESS IS LESS, MORE IS MORE, THAT'S ALL CAPC Bordeaux
	        AIR KISSING Arcadia University Art Gallery, Philadelphia
	        EXACT IMAGINATION CCAD Canzani Center Gallery, Columbus, Ohio

2006		FAX-BACKS Dolores/de Bruijne Projects, Amsterdam
		BRING THE WAR HOME Elizabeth Dee Gallery, New York & QED Gallery, Los Angeles

2005		STILL LIFE Museo de Arte Contemporáneo, Panama City: Museo de Arte Moderna, Guatemala City; SESI, São Paulo, Museo de Arte de Lima, Lima MAC, Niteroi, Rio de Janeiro

2003		FRASS UBS Bullion Vault, London
DID YOU HEAR ABOUT THAT FROG WHO WANTED TO BE A PRINCE? HE WENT TO A BED AND DREAMED THAT HE WAS ONE... WOKE UP AND FOUND THAT HE HAD BECOME ONE. HE WAS STILL A FROG Club Egg, London
FORGETKULT The McAllister Institute, New York
SUBSCRIBE: RECENTART IN PRINT Center for Curatorial Studies, Bard College, New York
NIHILISM/FAITH 47 Paul St, London
CHOKKABLOKKA Jeffrey Charles Gallery, London
STILL LIFE Museo de Belles Artes, Museo de Arte Carrillo Gill, Mexico City Caraccas & Biblioteca Luis Angel Arango, Bogota cat

References

External links
Art in America review of BANK at Gallerie Poo-Poo, February, 1999
BANK timeline
'Robert Prime gallery got BANK’d. Stephen Friedman gallery got BANK’d', ADP magazine, 4 November 2009.

BANK
BANK
English contemporary artists
English artist groups and collectives